The Bugis Museum, formerly known as the Bugis Heritage is a museum established in 1982 dedicated to the Bugis people in Pontian District, Johor, Malaysia. It is the first Bugis museum in Malaysia and there are around 2,000 artifacts displayed inside, such as weapons, clothes, old coins, jewellery and pictures.

See also
 List of museums in Malaysia

References

External links

 

1982 establishments in Malaysia
Museums established in 1982
Museums in Johor
Pontian District